11 Uhr 20 is a West German crime television miniseries in three episodes, each having a length of about 60 minutes. It was written by Herbert Reinecker, directed by Wolfgang Becker and produced by Helmut Ringelmann. The episodes were shown in colour on the ZDF channel in January 1970.

Plot
A married couple, the Wassems, are having a vacation in Turkey. One day they find a dead man in their car. Soon after this Mrs. Wassem dies in a car crash. The widowed Thomas Wassem, suspected of murder by the police, sets out to investigate the case on his own. The quest takes him to Tunisia, to find the real culprit.

Cast
 Joachim Fuchsberger as Thomas Wassem
 Werner Bruhns as Minotti
 Friedrich Joloff as Dr. Arnold Vogt
 Götz George as Muller

External links
 

German crime television series
1970s German television miniseries
Television shows set in Turkey
Tunisia in fiction
1970 German television series debuts
1970 German television series endings
1970s German-language films
German-language television shows
ZDF original programming